Ab Kamari is a district in the west of Badghis Province, Afghanistan. Its population was estimated at 36,300 in 2002, the ethnic makeup of which was approximately 80% Tajik with a Pashtun minority. The district capital is Sang Atesh. Other localities include Ab Khuda'i, Alkhan, Anjir, Duzdanak, Gana Gul, Khalifa, and Papal. Ab Kamari is known for its pistachio forests.

References

External links
Map of Ab Kamari (PDF)

Districts of Badghis Province